Rawat may refer to:

People 
 Rawat (surname), an Indian surname

Individuals 
 Bipin Rawat (1958-2021), Indian military officer
 Harish Rawat, politician
 Harisingh Rawat, politician from Rajasthan
Madhulika Rawat (1963–2021), Indian social worker
 Nain Singh Rawat, explorer
 Pradeep Rawat (politician), Indian politician
 Prem Rawat, speaker and teacher, formerly known as Guru Maharaj Ji
 Suresh Singh Rawat, politician from Rajasthan
 Shankar Singh Rawat, politician from Rajasthan
 Teelu Rauteli, 17th century warrior

Culture
 Chitrashi Rawat, actress
 Navi Rawat, US actress
 Pradeep Rawat (actor), Indian actor

Sports
 Harish Chandra Singh Rawat, mountaineer
 Prashant Singh Rawat, Indian basketball player
 Rawat Tana, Thai Paralympic  wheelchair racer

Places 
 Rawat, Islamabad, a town in Islamabad
 Rawat, Murree, a town in Punjab, Pakistan
 Rawat Fort, early 16th century fort built by the Gakhars in Punjab, Pakistan

Other uses 
 Rawat language, a Sino-Tibetan language of India

See also
 Rawal
 Panwar